Spanish Nights may refer to:

Songs
 "Spanish Nights", 1934 piano solo by Oscar Rasbach
 "Spanish Nights", on the 1966 album Shapes of Rhythm by Galt MacDermot
 "Spanish Nights", on the 1974 album I'm Still in Love with You
 "Spanish Nights", on the 1982 album MSB by the Michael Stanley Band
 "Spanish Nights", on the 1999 album Under a Violet Moon by Blackmore's Night
 "Spanish Nights", on the 2002 album Paradise
 "Spanish Nights", on the 2002 album Unicorns by Bill Caddick
 "Spanish Nights", on the 2008 album Tequila Moon by Jessy J
 "Spanish Nights", 2009 work by Joyce Grill

Other
 Spanish Nights (film), a 1931 American Pre-Code drama film
 Spanish Nights, 1994 novel by Jennifer Taylor

See also
 "Spanish Night", song from the 1979 album Heart String by Earl Klugh
 A Night in Spain, 1927 musical revue